Stars of the Grand Ole Opry is fourteenth studio album by American country music artist Jan Howard. It was released in April 1981 via First Generation Records and was produced by Pete Drake. It was Howard's first studio album to be released in five years and her only album to be recorded with the First Generation label. The album spawned one single upon its release. In addition, the album has been reissued in both compact disc and music download formats since its initial release.

Background, release and reception
Stars of the Grand Ole Opry was produced by Pete Drake. Drake asked Howard if she wanted to record an album as part of a series of releases made to promote members of the Grand Ole Opry. Howard agreed and recorded the sessions for the album at Pete's Place, a studio owned by Drake. The record contains re-recordings of songs Howard previously cut. This includes her major hits from the 1960s: "Bad Seed", "Evil on Your Mind" and "The One You Slip Around With". The album also included new material, such as Howard's composition entitled "The Life of a Country Girl Singer". Other new material included the song "Cowboy's Last Ride", which was written by Howard's friend Johnny Cash.

Stars of the Grand Ole Opry was first released in 1981 on First Generation Records in a vinyl record format. Five songs were included on the record's A-side and five on its B-side as well. Stars of the Grand Ole Opry did not reach major chart positions following its original release, notably the Billboard Top Country Albums, where Howard placed many studio albums. The album was later reissued on First Generation Records in September 1998 in compact disc format and in 2011 in a music download format. The album received four of five stars from Allmusic upon its reissue in 1998.

Track listing

Personnel
All credits are adapted from the liner notes of Stars of the Grand Ole Opry.

Musical personnel
 Hayword Bishop – drums
 Jimmy Capps – guitar
 Jimmie Crawford – steel guitar
 Pete Drake – steel guitar
 Bobby Emmons – piano
 Jan Howard – lead vocals
 Bill Hullett – guitar
 The Jordanaires – background vocals
 Shane Keister – piano
 Jerry Kroon – drums
 Bob Moore – bass
 Hargus "Pig" Robbins – piano
 Pete Wade – guitar
 Tommy Williams – fiddle

Technical personnel
 Randy Best – engineering
 Johnny Drake – engineering
 Pete Drake – producer
 Al Pachucki – engineering

Release history

References

1981 albums
Jan Howard albums
Albums produced by Pete Drake